Karina Paola Báez Trujillo (born 14 December 1976) is a Mexican football manager. Báez was most recently the manager of Club Universidad Nacional of the Liga MX Femenil.

Career 
In 2018, Báez assistant was put in charge as one of the assistant coaches for Pachuca.

In 2019, Báez became the assistant coach for UANL.

In 2021, Báez was named the head coach of Club Universidad Nacional. Báez was sacked 20 October 2022.

References 

1984 births
Living people
Mexican football managers